Burrall is a surname. Notable people with the surname include:

Fred Burrall (1935–2016), American politician
William Porter Burrall (1806–1874), American politician and railroad executive